The teardrop darter (Etheostoma barbouri) is a species of freshwater ray-finned fish, a darter from the subfamily Etheostomatinae, part of the family Percidae, which also contains the perches, ruffes and pikeperches. It is endemic to the eastern United States. It is only found in Kentucky and Tennessee, where it occurs in the middle to upper reaches of the Green River drainage. It inhabits small rivers and creeks and rocky pools where it feeds on the larvae of blackflies and midges, immature stages of caddisflies and mayflies, and cladocerans and copepods. This species creates nests in which the females deposit their eggs and these are guarded by the male and have been found to contain between 40 and 80 eggs. The teardrop darter was first formally described by Robert A. Kuehne and James W. Small Jr. in 1971 with the type locality given as Brush Creek, a tributary of the Green River, 2.7 miles north of Liberty, Casey County, Kentucky. The specific name honours Professor Roger W. Barbour (1919-1993) in recognition of his contribution to the knowledge of Kentucky's vertebrate fauna.

References

Etheostoma
Fish described in 1971